The 45th General Assembly of Prince Edward Island was in session from February 15, 1944, to October 27, 1947. The Liberal Party led by John Walter Jones formed the government.

Thomas R. Cullen was elected speaker.

There were four sessions of the 45th General Assembly:

Members

Kings

Prince

Queens

Notes:

References
  Election results for the Prince Edward Island Legislative Assembly, 1943-09-15
 O'Handley, Kathryn Canadian Parliamentary Guide, 1994 

Terms of the General Assembly of Prince Edward Island
1944 establishments in Prince Edward Island
1947 disestablishments in Prince Edward Island